The Nestea Beach Volleyball is a beach volleyball tournament held during the Summer season in the Philippines. Held in the Boracay Beach Chalets, Station 2 in Boracay Island in Aklan, the Nestea Beach Volleyball is the longest-running beach volleyball tournament in the country and the main attraction of the Nestea Love the Beach event in Boracay usually held on April until May or the Labor Day Weekend. It consists into two parts: the Intercollegiate Beach Volleyball tournament featuring collegiate teams from different parts of the country and the Fantasy Match where semi-pro players (consists of two teams by 4 players) duel in a beach volleyball exhibition game.

The tournament is organized by Volleyworks and sanctioned by the Philippine Volleyball Federation (PVF), thru Executive Director Otie Camangian which served as the tournament director.

Events

Intercollegiate Beach Volleyball
In the 19th edition of the tourney, 10 teams will be competed in the men's divisions including the finals contenders University of Southern Philippines Foundation Panthers and the CSB Blazers, while in the distaff side, 12 teams will be participating in the three-day event, among them are the 2015 champions UST Golden Tigresses and first runner-up DLSU Lady Spikers. Tournament director Camangian stated that if the tourney will have a conflict with the UAAP women's volleyball finals, the teams will send a Team B composed of those who not make it in the line-up of the UAAP team.

2016 teams
The teams are composed of the champion teams in their respective collegiate beach volleyball leagues.

Fantasy Match
In 2015, Fantasy Match, a side event of the competition was added in the line-up of the activities in the Nestea Beach tourney. For the 2016 edition, top volleyball players in the country will be played in the Fantasy Match on April 29–30, coinciding with the semifinals and finals of the intercollegiate beach volleyball tourney.

Members of last year's fantasy match champions Team Light Blue, Rachel Anne Daquis, Cha Cruz, and Michele Gumabao will return in the sand for the second straight appearance. Gumabao and Cruz will play for Team Chillax, while Daquis will play for Team Plunge.

See also
Beach Volleyball Republic

References

Sports in Aklan
Recurring sporting events established in 1998
Beach volleyball competitions in the Philippines